2016 is the ninth competitive season for the Cairns based Sea Swift Northern Pride Rugby League Football Club. They played in the QRL state competition, the Intrust Super Cup. 14 clubs competed, with each club playing 23 matches (12 home and 11 away) over 25 rounds.

Staff

Coaches
 Head coach: Joe O'Callaghan 
 Assistant coach (defence): Shane O'Flanagan
 Assistant coach (Attack): Leon Hallie
 Assistant coach / Head trainer (Positional/CDRL Allocation Players): Darren Ferricks

Managers
 Chief executive officer: Rod Jensen 
 Chairman: Bob Fowler (stepped down 10 December 2015). 
 Interim Chairman: Terry Mackenroth (December 2015-2016) 
 Club director: Tony Williamson
 Team manager: Alan Marsh
 Assistant manager (Home): Kev Anderson
 Assistant manager (Away Crew): Murray Stalley
 Head first aid officer: Deb Gallop
 Medical (Away crew): Max Conroy
 Welfare officer: Michael White

High Performance Unit
 Club Sports Science Consultant: Dr Stephen Bird
 High Performance Manager: Matt Di Salvo
 Strength and conditioning Coach: Scott Sudale
 Assistant Strength and Conditioning Coach: Peter Nash 
 Rehab Coordinator: Megan Harding
 Physiotherapist: Tim Lowcock
 Sports Dietician: Mitchell Smith
 Mental Edge Coach: Robert Gronbeck

Player managers
 Team captain: Ryan Ghietti

Player awards
 Sea Swift Most improved player - Jared Allen 
 Sea Swift Best Back - Justin Castellaro
 Sea Swift Best Forward - Tom Hancock
 Sea Swift Players' Player - Sheldon Powe-Hobbs
 Sea Swift Player of the Year - David Murphy
 John O'Brien Club Person of the Year - Gordon Greaves

Squad

 Linc Port (Fullback/Centre)

 Khan Ahwang (Fullback/Centre)

 Luke George (vc) (Wing)

 Justin Castellaro (Centre)

 Rajan Opetaia-Halls (Wing/Centre)

 Akeripa Tia-Kilife (Wing/Centre)

 Brayden Torpy (Halfback)

 Jordan Biondi-Odo (Five-eighth)

 Jared Allen (Five-eighth)

 Ryan Ghietti (c) (Hooker)

 Jack Svendsen (Prop)

 David Murphy (Prop)

 Sheldon Powe-Hobbs (Lock/Second Row)

 Vaipuna Tia Kilifi (Second Row)

 Rajan Opetia-Halls (Second Row)

 Tom Hancock (Second Row)

 Ben Reuter (Second Row)

 Lachlan Parmenter (Second Row)

 Ben Schell

 Denzel King (Dummy Half)

 Keelan White

 Ben Spina (Prop)

 Javid Bowen (Wing)

 Patrick Kafusi (Prop)

 Shaun Hudson (Wing)

 Lachlan Coote

 Scott Bolton

 Antonio Winterstein

Greg Miglio (Tully Tigers)

Colin Wilkie (Innisfail Leprechauns)

Fred Koraba (Innisfail Brothers)
 
Shawn Bowen (Mossman-Port Douglas Sharks)

Sam Pau (Kangaroos)

Ned Blackman (Atherton Roosters)

Ben Schell (Cairns Brothers)

Daniel Tatipata (Edmonton Storm)

Ian King (Mareeba Gladiators)

Jack Brock (Southern Suburbs)

Menmuny Murgha (Yarrabah Seahawks)

Broski Emery-Hunia (Brothers)

Aidan Day (Southern Suburbs)

Patrick Lewis (Kangaroos)

Luke La Rosa (Brothers)

Statistics

North Queensland Cowboys who played for the Northern Pride in 2015

2016 player gains
  Brayden Torpy (half-back) from the NRL Gold Coast Titans Under-20s.
  Rajan Opetaia-Halls (backrow) from Queensland Cup Central Queensland Capras.
  Khan Ahwang (backrow) from Queensland Cup Burleigh Bears.
  Akeripa Tia Kilifi (centre) from the NRL North Queensland Cowboys Under-20s.
 Ben Reuter from CDRL Innisfail Leprechauns.

Pride/CDRL 2016 Portability Program
 Colin Wilkie from CDRL Innisfail Leprechauns.
 Ned Blackman from CDRL Atherton Rooster
 Ben Schell from CDRL Cairns Brothers.
 Daniel Tatipata from CDRL Edmonton Storm.
 Fred Koraba from CDRL Innisfail Brothers.
 Jared Verney from CDRL Ivanhoe Knights.
 Sam Pau from CDRL Kangaroos.
 Ian King from CDRL Mareeba Gladiators.
 Shawn Bowen from CDRL Mossman-Port Douglas Sharks.
 Jack Brock from CDRL Southern Suburbs.
 Greg Miglio from CDRL Tully Tigers.
 Menmuny Murgha from CDRL Yarrabah Seahawks.

Player losses after 2015 season
  Brett Anderson retired.
  Jason Roos retired.
  Alex Starmer retired.
  Semi Tadulala retired.
  Sam Obst retired.
  Hezron Murgha to Queensland Cup side Townsville Blackhawks 
  Graham Clark to the NRL Canterbury Bulldogs 
  Codey Kennedy to Queensland Cup side Tweed Heads Seagulls 
  Regan Verney Queensland Cup side Mackay Cutters 
  Nathan Wales released to go traveling.
  Brent Oosen released due to work commitments.
  Maddie Oosen released.
  Dean McGilvray released.
  Travis Peeters released.
  P J Webb released for personal reasons.
  Jared Verney released.
  Bradley Stephen released.

Season launch
 Cairns Induction Day: Saturday 31 October 2015.
 Training for the 2016 season started on Monday 2 November 2015.
 2016 Corporate Launch:
 2016 ISC Season Launch: Friday, 4 March 2016 at the Treasury Casino's Hotel Courtyard, Brisbane, hosted by Channel 9 commentators Scott Sattler and Peter Psaltis, guests heard from QRL Managing Director Robert Moore, Chairman Peter Betros and Intrust Super CEO Brendan O’Farrell.

Jerseys

Sponsors
Naming rights sponsor:
 Sea Swift
Jersey sponsor:
 Sea Swift
 XXXX
 Emu Sportswear
Jersey sponsor (back of jersey):
 Sponsorship of individual players available from $6,500
Sleeve sponsor:
 Rivers Insurance Brokers & L J Hooker
Shorts sponsor:
 Cairns Regional Council
 Intrust Super
Playing strip manufacturer:
 EMU Sportswear
Other sponsors: Brothers World of Entertainment; Calanna Pharmacy; BDO; James Cook University; CDRL; hm Health Management; Queensland Country Credit Union; Phoenix Dynamic Sports Entertainment; Cairns Colonial Club Resort; First Response; ASN; Cairns Sports Performance Clinic; Kennards Hire; Proarch Podiatry; Brilliant Technologies; Cairns Total Physio; Queensland Country Health Fund; Pacific Toyota; Ransom Specialty Coffee Roasters; Cairns Hardware; Visual Imaging; Devenish Law.
Media partners: Sea FM; WIN Television; Cairns Post.

Fixtures

Trial matches

Intrust Super Cup matches

Ladder

Televised games

Channel Nine
In August 2012 as part of the historic $1 billion five-year broadcasting agreement with Nine and Fox Sports, the Australian Rugby League Commission confirmed that Intrust Super Cup matches would be televised by Channel 9 until 2018. One match a week is shown live across Queensland at 2.00pm (AEST) on Sunday afternoons on Channel 9 (or GEM), on WIN Television (RTQ) in regional areas and on Imparja Television in remote areas. The match is also broadcast in Papua New Guinea on Kundu 2 TV. The 2015 commentary team is Peter Psaltis, Scott Sattler and Mathew Thompson.
 2016 Northern Pride televised games - Channel 9, WIN Television (RTQ), Imparja Television and Kundu 2 TV.
 1:  Sunshine Coast Falcons beat Northern Pride 25-24: Round 1, Sunday 6 March 2016, 12.40 pm (Zaidee's Rainbow Foundation Round) from Sunshine Coast Stadium, Sportsmans Parade, Kawana Waters, Sunshine Coast.
 2: Northern Pride beat Redcliffe Dolphins 20-16: Round 10, Sunday 15 May 2016, 1.40 pm (Indigenous Appreciation Round) from Barlow Park, Cairns.

References

External links
 Northern Pride Official site
 Northern Pride Facebook Page
 Northern Pride Twitter Page
 Northern Pride YouTube Page
 2012 Northern Pride match highlights on YouTube

Northern Pride RLFC seasons
2016 in Australian rugby league
2016 in rugby league by club